Mrs. Lovett is a fictional character appearing in many adaptations of the story Sweeney Todd. Her first name is most commonly referred to as Nellie, although she has also been referred to as Amelia, Margery, Maggie, Sarah, Shirley, Wilhelmina and Claudetta. A baker from London, Mrs. Lovett is an accomplice and business partner of Sweeney Todd, a barber and serial killer from Fleet Street. She makes meat pies from Todd’s victims.

First appearing in the Victorian penny dreadful serial The String of Pearls, it is debated if she was based on an actual person or not. The character also appears in modern media related to Sweeney Todd including the Stephen Sondheim musical and its 2007 film adaptation.

Character overview 
In every version of the story in which she appears, Mrs. Lovett is the business partner and accomplice of barber/serial killer Sweeney Todd; in some versions, she is also his lover. She makes and sells meat pies made from Todd's victims.

While in most versions of the Sweeney Todd story Mrs. Lovett's past history is not stated, usually she is depicted as a childless widow, although in some rare depictions, Mr. Albert Lovett is shown. In Christopher Bond's 1973 play Sweeney Todd: The Demon Barber of Fleet Street and Stephen Sondheim's 1979 musical adaptation, before she goes into business with Todd she is living in poverty in a filthy, vermin-infested flat, and laments that her pies are the worst ones in London. While she feels no remorse about using the bodies of Todd's victims in her pies, she is sometimes shown to have a softer side to those in need. In the Bond play and Sondheim musical, she takes in the young orphan Tobias Ragg and considers taking in Todd's daughter Johanna, as well. In the original "penny dreadful" serial and George Dibdin Pitt's 1847 stage play, The String of Pearls; or, The Fiend of Fleet Street, however, this soft side does not extend to her "assistants", whom she imprisons in the bakehouse and often works to death.

Various interpretations 

Although Mrs. Lovett's character and role in the story are similar in each version, certain details vary according to the story's interpretation. In some versions, for example, Mrs. Lovett commits suicide when their crimes are discovered, while in others, Todd kills her himself or she is arrested and escapes execution by turning King's Evidence against Todd. Her physical appearance varies from a slim and alluring beauty, to a plump, homely lunatic. Her age is also differing in many adaptations; though it is never specifically stated in any versions, there are some (most noticeably in Sondheim's musical) where she is older than Todd, often by a difference of over fifteen years and others where she is around his age. Whether their relationship is platonic, romantic, or merely sexual also varies according to interpretation.

Role in the musical 
In Stephen Sondheim's 1979 stage musical Sweeney Todd, the Demon Barber of Fleet Street and Tim Burton's 2007 film adaptation, Todd pays a visit to Mrs. Lovett's pie shop below his old home after 15 years in exile, seeking information about his lost family. Mrs. Lovett recognizes him as her former tenant, Benjamin Barker, with whom she was (and is) secretly in love. She informs him that his wife, Lucy, was sexually abused by Judge Turpin, who had exiled Todd on a false charge, and informs Todd that Lucy was so distraught that she poisoned herself with arsenic. Seeking vengeance, Todd reopens his shaving parlour above the shop, and slits the throats of his customers. Mrs. Lovett initiates a plan for Todd to send the corpses of his victims down a chute that leads to her bakehouse. She then uses the flesh to bake meat pies, which make her business very successful.

She and Todd take in an orphan, Tobias Ragg, to whom she becomes like a mother. She also dreams of marrying Todd, who is completely uninterested in her.

In the story's climactic "Final Sequence", Todd murders Beadle Bamford, Turpin and a beggar woman, and discovers that the latter is actually Lucy. Todd confronts Mrs. Lovett, who confesses that Lucy survived drinking the poison but was driven insane, reduced to begging. Todd then demands to know why Mrs. Lovett lied to him, to which Mrs. Lovett then confesses her love for him, and promises she would be a better wife than Lucy ever was. Todd pretends to forgive her, but later throws her into the furnace, burning her alive as retribution for her lies. However, killing Lovett proves to be Todd's fatal mistake; Tobias, who loved her like a mother, emerges from hiding and kills Todd by slitting his throat with his own razor.

Sondheim based his characterization of Mrs. Lovett in large part upon the Utilitarian ideas criticized by Charles Dickens in his novel Hard Times, specifically in relation to the character of Mr. Thomas Gradgrind, who embodies the Utilitarian ideas and who takes pride in frequently referring to himself as "eminently practical," which Dickens emphasizes to be the character's primary character trait on numerous occasions. This is evidenced by the following: first, on two occasions in Sondheim's musical, Sweeney refers to Mrs. Lovett as "eminently practical" when praising her cold-blooded resourcefulness in relation to her meat pie recipes (which are logically Utilitarian in nature); and second, Mrs. Lovett concludes her opening number by stating twice that "Times is hard," a thinly veiled reference to the title of the Dickens novel.

Portrayals 
In film and stage adaptations of the Sweeney Todd story, Lovett is considered the female lead.

Stella Rho portrayed her in the 1936 film Sweeney Todd: The Demon Barber of Fleet Street.
Jane Mallett played Mrs. Lovett in a radio adaptation of the George Dibdin Pitt play for CBC Radio in 1947.
Raffaella Ottiano played Mrs. Lovett in the 1924 Broadway production of George Dibdin Pitt's play.
Heather Canning played Mrs. Lovett in a 1970 episode of Mystery and Imagination opposite Freddie Jones' Sweeney Todd.
 Angela Lansbury won a Tony for Best Leading Actress in a Musical, originating the role on Broadway in 1979 at the Uris Theatre (now the Gershwin). She also continued to perform the role for the 1980 American tour, which was taped and broadcast by PBS on its show Great Performances in 1982, for which Lansbury was nominated for a 1985 Primetime Emmy for Best Individual Performance in a Variety or Music Program.
Dorothy Loudon replaced Lansbury in the original Broadway production.
 Sheila Hancock played Mrs. Lovett in the original 1980 West End production at Drury Lane. She received an Olivier nomination for Best Leading Actress in a Musical.
June Havoc portrayed the character in a 1982 tour following the PBS broadcast.
Joyce Castle portrayed the role in the 1984 opera at the Houston Grand Opera, the first operatic adaptation.
Beth Fowler earned a Tony nomination for Best Leading Actress in a Musical in the first Broadway revival at the Circle in the Square Theatre in 1989.
Julia McKenzie played the role in the 1993 West End revival at the National Theatre Cottesloe and Lyttelton, for which she won the Olivier for Best Leading Actress in a Musical. She repeated the role in a 1994 BBC Radio adaptation of the production.
Joanna Lumley portrayed Mrs. Lovett in the 1998 Showtime television movie The Tale of Sweeney Todd starring Ben Kingsley. Her character has a romantic relationship with him, as opposed to the unrequited attraction depicted in most versions of the story.  She is additionally—and with the implied consent of Todd—sexually involved with a local judge, to whom she provides sadomasochistic release. She is arrested for her crimes in the end.
 Patti LuPone has played the role on two occasions: in concert (2000 and 2001) and on Broadway (2005). Her interpretation of the character differed in both performances. In the semi-staged concert version, LuPone played the role in the way that Lansbury or Hancock would have originally played it, as a "homely lunatic". This portrayal was seen at the Avery Fisher Hall of Lincoln Center, a taped production in San Francisco and at the Ravinia Festival in Chicago. However, in 2005, to suit the fresh, dark and sparse approach to the show, LuPone had to "throw all that out" and create a new look for the character: her interpretation became more lustful and sex-starved, with a dry wit throughout. She received a Tony nomination for Best Leading Actress in a Musical for the 2005 Broadway production at the Eugene O'Neill Theatre.
Christine Baranski received positive reviews opposite Brian Stokes Mitchell in the Kennedy Center's 2002 production. She also played the role in the 1999 concert at the Ahmanson Theatre in Los Angeles.
Felicity Palmer performed as Lovett in the 2003 production at the Royal Opera House, its only musical produced.
Elaine Paige portrayed the role in the 2004 opera at the New York City Opera, for which she was nominated for the Drama Desk for Best Leading Actress in a Musical.
Essie Davis played the role of Mrs. Lovett in the 2006 BBC television film, simply titled Sweeney Todd.
Helena Bonham Carter portrayed the character in Tim Burton's movie version of the musical: Sweeney Todd: The Demon Barber of Fleet Street. She received a Golden Globe nomination for Golden Globe Award for Best Actress in a Motion Picture – Comedy or Musical. 
Judy Kaye filled in for LuPone for a week (while LuPone was on vacation) in the 2005 Broadway revival, before it ended production in early 2006. She went on to the 2007 Canadian and American tour version of the John Doyle revival for which she received acclaim and had to learn to play the tuba. She also appeared in the 2000 concert at the Royal Festival Hall in London.
Anita Reeves played her in the 2007 Gate Theatre production.
Imelda Staunton played Mrs. Lovett in the 2011 production at the Chichester Festival Theatre which transferred to the West End in 2012 at the Adelphi Theatre.
Caroline O'Connor appeared in the original Paris production of 2011 at the Théâtre du Châtelet.
Emma Thompson performed as Mrs. Lovett in the 2014 New York Philharmonic semi-staged concert version. This adaptation was recorded for PBS Great Performances series, resulting in Thompson earning an Emmy nomination for Best Leading Actress in a movie.
Siobhán McCarthy played Mrs. Lovett in the 2014 West End production and in its 2017 Off-Broadway transfer to the Barrow Street Theatre from February 14, 2017 until April 9, 2017.
Carolee Carmello played Mrs. Lovett in the 2017 Off-Broadway production at the Barrow Street Theatre from April 11, 2017 until February 25, 2018.
Sally Ann Triplett played Mrs. Lovett in the 2017 Off-Broadway production at the Barrow Street Theatre from February 22, 2018 until the show's closing on August 26, 2018.
Gina Riley played Mrs. Lovett in a 2019 limited run that played in both Sydney and Melbourne.
Lea Salonga played Mrs. Lovett in a production at Manila's The Theatre at Solarie, opening in October 2019, which then opened in Singapore in November after the end of the Manila run.
Jeon Mi-do played Mrs. Lovett in 2016 and 2022/2023 Korean Musical production at Charlotte Theater,Seoul,South Korea.
Annaleigh Ashford currently plays Mrs. Lovett in the 2023 revival of Sweeney Todd on Broadway.

Songs 
In the musical Mrs. Lovett sings many numbers by herself and with other characters. The tracks were all composed by Stephen Sondheim. These include:

 "The Worst Pies in London"
 "Poor Thing"*
 "My Friends" (with Todd)
 "Pirelli's Miracle Elixir" (with Tobias, Todd and Company)*
 "Wait" (with Todd)
 "Epiphany" (with Todd)
 "A Little Priest" (with Todd)*
 "God, That's Good" (with Tobias, Todd and Company)*
 "By the Sea" (with Todd)*
 "Not While I'm Around" (with Tobias)*
 "Parlour Songs (Sweet Polly Plunkett)" (with Beadle Bamford)**
 "Parlour Songs Part 2" (The Tower of Bray)" (with Beadle and Tobias)**
 "Searching" (with Todd, Johanna, Anthony, and Beggar Woman)*
 "Final Sequence" (with Todd and Tobias)
 "The Ballad of Sweeney Todd (Epilogue)" (with Company)**

(* Edited for 2007 film)
(** Cut from 2007 film)

References 

Characters in Sweeney Todd
Female characters in film
Female characters in literature
Female literary villains
Female film villains
Female horror film villains
Fictional bakers
Literary characters introduced in 1846
Fictional businesspeople
Fictional murdered people
Fictional murderers
Fictional people from London
Fictional shopkeepers
Female characters in musical theatre